Maize is a plant cultivated for food.

Maize may also refer to:

 Maize (album), by Pushmonkey
 Maize (color), a shade of yellow, named for the cereal of the same name
 Maize (video game), a 2016 Point-and-click adventure video game
 Maize, Kansas, a city in Sedgwick County, Kansas, United States

See also
 Corn (disambiguation)
 Maze (disambiguation)